The study of geodesics on an ellipsoid arose in connection with geodesy specifically with the solution of triangulation networks.  The figure of the Earth is well approximated by an oblate ellipsoid, a slightly flattened sphere.  A geodesic is the shortest path between two points on a curved surface, analogous to a straight line on a plane surface.  The solution of a triangulation network on an ellipsoid is therefore a set of exercises in spheroidal trigonometry .

If the Earth is treated as a sphere, the geodesics are great circles (all of which are closed) and the problems reduce to ones in spherical trigonometry.  However,  showed that the effect of the rotation of the Earth results in its resembling a slightly oblate ellipsoid: in this case, the equator and the meridians are the only simple closed geodesics.  Furthermore, the shortest path between two points on the equator does not necessarily run along the equator.  Finally, if the ellipsoid is further perturbed to become a triaxial ellipsoid (with three distinct semi-axes), only three geodesics are closed.

Geodesics on an ellipsoid of revolution 
There are several ways of defining geodesics .  A simple definition is as the shortest path between two points on a surface.  However, it is frequently more useful to define them as paths with zero geodesic curvature—i.e., the analogue of straight lines on a curved surface.  This definition encompasses geodesics traveling so far across the ellipsoid's surface that they start to return toward the starting point, so that other routes are more direct, and includes paths that intersect or re-trace themselves.  Short enough segments of a geodesics are still the shortest route between their endpoints, but geodesics are not necessarily globally minimal (i.e. shortest among all possible paths).  Every globally-shortest path is a geodesic, but not vice versa.

By the end of the 18th century, an ellipsoid of revolution (the term spheroid is also used) was a well-accepted approximation to the figure of the Earth.  The adjustment of triangulation networks entailed reducing all the measurements to a reference ellipsoid and solving the resulting two-dimensional problem as an exercise in spheroidal trigonometry  .

It is possible to reduce the various geodesic problems into one of two types. The two geodesic problems usually considered are:
For a sphere the solutions to these problems are simple exercises in spherical trigonometry, whose solution is given by formulas for solving a spherical triangle. (See the article on great-circle navigation.)

During the 18th century geodesics were typically referred to as "shortest lines".
The term "geodesic line" (actually, a curve) was coined by :
Nous désignerons cette ligne sous le nom de ligne géodésique [We will call this line the geodesic line].
This terminology was introduced into English either as "geodesic line" or as "geodetic line", for example ,
A line traced in the manner we have now been describing, or deduced from trigonometrical measures, by the means we have indicated, is called a geodetic or geodesic line: it has the property of being the shortest which can be drawn between its two extremities on the surface of the Earth; and it is therefore the proper itinerary measure of the distance between those two points.
In its adoption by other fields geodesic line, frequently shortened to geodesic, was preferred.

This section treats the problem on an ellipsoid of revolution (both oblate and prolate).  The problem on a triaxial ellipsoid is covered in the next section.

Equations for a geodesic 

Consider an ellipsoid of revolution with equatorial radius  and polar semi-axis .  Define the flattening , the eccentricity , and the second eccentricity :

Let an elementary segment of a path on the ellipsoid have length .
 
The elementary segment is therefore given by

or

The shortest path or geodesic entails finding that function  which minimizes . This is an exercise in the calculus of variations and the minimizing condition is given by the Beltrami identity,

Differentiating this relation gives

This, together with Eqs. , leads to a system of ordinary differential equations for a geodesic

We can express  in terms of the parametric latitude, using

and Clairaut's relation then becomes

In order to find the relation for the third side , the spherical arc length, and included angle , the spherical longitude, it is useful to consider the triangle  representing a geodesic starting at the equator; see Fig.  5.  In this figure, the variables referred to the auxiliary sphere are shown with the corresponding quantities for the ellipsoid shown in parentheses.

If the side  is extended by moving  infinitesimally (see Fig. 6), we obtain
 

which gives

so that the differential equations for the geodesic become

 
where

This yields
 
and the limits on the integrals are chosen so that  at the equator crossing, .

This completes the solution of the path of a geodesic using the auxiliary sphere.  By this device a great circle can be mapped exactly to a geodesic on an ellipsoid of revolution.

There are also several ways of approximating geodesics on a terrestrial ellipsoid (with small flattening) ; some of these are described in the article on geographical distance. However, these are typically comparable in complexity to the method for the exact solution .

Behavior of geodesics 

Fig. 7 shows the simple closed geodesics which consist of the meridians (green) and the equator (red).  (Here the qualification "simple" means that the geodesic closes on itself without an intervening self-intersection.)  This follows from the equations for the geodesics given in the previous section.

The geodesic oscillates about the equator.

If the ellipsoid is sufficiently oblate, i.e., another class of simple closed geodesics is possible .  Two such geodesics are illustrated in Figs. 11 and 12.  Here  and the equatorial azimuth, for the green (resp. blue) geodesic is chosen to be  (resp. ), so that the geodesic completes 2 (resp. 3) complete oscillations about the equator on one circuit of the ellipsoid.

Fig. 13 shows geodesics (in blue) emanating  with  a multiple of  up to the point at which they cease to be shortest paths. Also shown (in green) are curves of constant , which are the geodesic circles centered .  showed that, on any surface, geodesics and geodesic circle intersect at right angles. On a sphere, the cut locus is a point. If
 lies on the equator, this relation is exact and as a consequence the equator is only a shortest geodesic if .

Differential properties of geodesics 
Various problems involving geodesics require knowing their behavior when they are perturbed. This is useful in trigonometric adjustments , determining the physical properties of signals which follow geodesics, etc.

As a second order, linear, homogeneous differential equation, its solution may be expressed as the sum of two independent solutions

where

Their basic definitions are illustrated in Fig. 14.

The Gaussian curvature for an ellipsoid of revolution is

On a closed surface such as an ellipsoid,  oscillates about zero. The point at which  becomes zero is the point conjugate to the starting point. If this condition is not satisfied, then there is a nearby path (not necessarily a geodesic) which is shorter. Thus, the Jacobi condition is a local property of the geodesic and is only a necessary condition for the geodesic being a global shortest path. Necessary and sufficient conditions for a geodesic being the shortest path are:
 for an oblate ellipsoid, ;
 for a prolate ellipsoid, if ; if , the supplemental condition  is required if .

Envelope of geodesics 

The geodesics from a particular point  if continued past the cut locus form an envelope illustrated in Fig. 15. (The geodesics are only shown for their first passage close to the antipodal point, not for subsequent ones.) Some geodesic circles are shown in green; these form cusps on the envelope. The cut locus is shown in red.

This corresponds to the situation on the sphere where there are "short" and "long" routes on a great circle between two points. Inside the astroid four geodesics intersect at each point. Four such geodesics are shown in Fig. 16 where the geodesics are numbered in order of increasing length. The two shorter geodesics are stable, i.e., so that there is no nearby path connecting the two points which is shorter; the other two are unstable. Only the shortest line (the first one) has . All the geodesics are tangent to the envelope which is shown in green in the figure.

Likewise, the geodesic circles are involutes of the astroid.

Area of a geodesic polygon  

A geodesic polygon is a polygon whose sides are geodesics. It is analogous to a spherical polygon, whose sides are great circles. The area of such a polygon may be found by first computing the area between a geodesic segment and the equator, i.e., the area of the quadrilateral  in Fig. 1 .  Once this area is known, the area of a polygon may be computed by summing the contributions from all the edges of the polygon.

The area of any closed region of the ellipsoid is

Now the Gauss–Bonnet theorem applied to a geodesic polygon states

where

Applying this formula to the quadrilateral , noting that , and performing the integral over  gives

where the integral is over the geodesic line (so that  is implicitly a function of ). The integral can be expressed as a series valid for small   .

The area of a geodesic polygon is given by summing  over its edges.  This result holds provided that the polygon does not include a pole; if it does,  must be added to the sum.  If the edges are specified by their vertices, then a convenient expression for the geodesic excess  is

Solution of the direct and inverse problems 

Solving the geodesic problems entails mapping the geodesic onto the auxiliary sphere and solving the corresponding problem in great-circle navigation.

In the case of the inverse problem,  is given; this cannot be easily related to the equivalent spherical angle  because  is unknown. Thus, the solution of the problem requires that  be found iteratively (root finding); see  for details.

In geodetic applications, where  is small, the integrals are typically evaluated as a series      .  For arbitrary , the integrals (3) and (4) can be found by numerical quadrature or by expressing them in terms of elliptic integrals  .

Geodesics on a triaxial ellipsoid 
Solving the geodesic problem for an ellipsoid of revolution is mathematically straightforward: because of symmetry, geodesics have a constant of motion, given by Clairaut's relation allowing the problem to be reduced to quadrature.  By the early 19th century (with the work of Legendre, Oriani, Bessel, et al.), there was a complete understanding of the properties of geodesics on an ellipsoid of revolution.

On the other hand, geodesics on a triaxial ellipsoid (with three unequal axes) have no obvious constant of the motion and thus represented a challenging unsolved problem in the first half of the 19th century.  In a remarkable paper,  discovered a constant of the motion allowing this problem to be reduced to quadrature also .

Triaxial ellipsoid coordinate system 

Consider the ellipsoid defined by

where  are Cartesian coordinates centered on the ellipsoid and, without loss of generality, .

employed the (triaxial) ellipsoidal coordinates (with triaxial ellipsoidal latitude and triaxial ellipsoidal longitude) defined by

In the limit ,  becomes the parametric latitude for an oblate ellipsoid, so the use of the symbol  is consistent with the previous sections. However,  is different from the spherical longitude defined above.

These constitute an orthogonal coordinate system: the grid lines intersect at right angles. These lines meet at four umbilical points (two of which are visible in this figure) where the principal radii of curvature are equal.

The grid lines of the ellipsoidal coordinates may be interpreted in three
different ways:
 They are "lines of curvature" on the ellipsoid: they are parallel to the directions of principal curvature .
 They are also intersections of the ellipsoid with confocal systems of hyperboloids of one and two sheets .
 Finally they are geodesic ellipses and hyperbolas defined using two adjacent umbilical points .  For example, the lines of constant  in Fig. 17 can be generated with the familiar string construction for ellipses with the ends of the string pinned to the two umbilical points.

Jacobi's solution 
Jacobi showed that the geodesic equations, expressed in ellipsoidal coordinates, are separable.  Here is how he recounted his discovery to his friend and neighbor Bessel ,
 The day before yesterday, I reduced to quadrature the problem of geodesic lines on an ellipsoid with three unequal axes.  They are the simplest formulas in the world, Abelian integrals, which become the well known elliptic integrals if 2 axes are set equal.
Königsberg, 28th Dec. '38.

The solution given by Jacobi   is

As Jacobi notes "a function of the angle  equals a function of the angle . These two functions are just Abelian integrals..." Two constants  and  appear in the solution. However, for geodesics that start at an umbilical points, we have  and  determines the direction at the umbilical point.
The constant  may be expressed as

where  is the angle the geodesic makes with lines of constant .

Survey of triaxial geodesics 

To survey the other geodesics, it is convenient to consider geodesics that intersect the middle principal section, at right angles.  Such geodesics are shown in Figs. 18–22, which use the same ellipsoid parameters and the same viewing direction as Fig. 17.  In addition, the three principal ellipses are shown in red in each of these figures.

The geodesic oscillates north and south of the equator; on each oscillation it completes slightly less than a full circuit around the ellipsoid resulting, in the typical case, in the geodesic filling the area bounded by the two latitude lines . Two examples are given in Figs. 18 and 19. Figure 18 shows practically the same behavior as for an oblate ellipsoid of revolution (because ); compare to Fig. 9.

The geodesic oscillates east and west of the ellipse ; on each oscillation it completes slightly more than a full circuit around the ellipsoid.
If , all meridians are geodesics; the effect of  causes such geodesics to oscillate east and west.
Two examples are given in Figs. 20 and 21. The constriction of the geodesic near the pole disappears in the limit ; in this case, the ellipsoid becomes a prolate ellipsoid and Fig. 20 would resemble Fig. 10 (rotated on its side).

A single geodesic does not fill an area on the ellipsoid. All tangents to umbilical geodesics touch the confocal hyperbola that intersects the ellipsoid at the umbilic points.

Umbilical geodesic enjoy several interesting properties.
 Through any point on the ellipsoid, there are two umbilical geodesics.
 The geodesic distance between opposite umbilical points is the same regardless of the initial direction of the geodesic.
If it is perturbed, it will swing out of the plane  and flip around before returning to close to the plane. (This behavior may repeat depending on the nature of the initial perturbation.)

Applications 
The direct and inverse geodesic problems no longer play the central role in geodesy that they once did.  Instead of solving adjustment of geodetic networks as a two-dimensional problem in spheroidal trigonometry, these problems are now solved by three-dimensional methods .
Nevertheless, terrestrial geodesics still play an important role in several areas:
 for measuring distances and areas in geographic information systems;
 the definition of maritime boundaries ;
 in the rules of the Federal Aviation Administration for area navigation ;
 the method of measuring distances in the FAI Sporting Code .
 help Muslims find their direction toward Mecca

By the principle of least action, many problems in physics can be formulated as a variational problem similar to that for geodesics.  Indeed, the geodesic problem is equivalent to the motion of a particle constrained to move on the surface, but otherwise subject to no forces  .
For this reason, geodesics on simple surfaces such as ellipsoids of revolution or triaxial ellipsoids are frequently used as "test cases" for exploring new methods.  Examples include:
 the development of elliptic integrals  and elliptic functions ;
 the development of differential geometry  ;
 methods for solving systems of differential equations by a change of independent variables ;
 the study of caustics ;
 investigations into the number and stability of periodic orbits ;
 in the limit , geodesics on a triaxial ellipsoid reduce to a case of dynamical billiards;
 extensions to an arbitrary number of dimensions ;
 geodesic flow on a surface .

See also 
 Earth section paths
 Figure of the Earth
 Geographical distance
 Great-circle navigation
 Great ellipse
 Geodesic
 Geodesy
 Map projection
 Map projection of the triaxial ellipsoid
 Meridian arc
 Rhumb line
 Vincenty's formulae

Notes

References

External links 
 Online geodesic bibliography of books and articles on geodesics on ellipsoids.
 Test set for geodesics, a set of 500000 geodesics for the WGS84 ellipsoid, computed using high-precision arithmetic.
 NGS tool implementing .
 geod(1), man page for the PROJ utility for geodesic calculations.
 Drawing geodesics on Google Maps.

Geodesy
Geodesic (mathematics)
Differential geometry
Calculus of variations
Curves